Ferguson Electronics (formerly known as Ferguson Radio Corporation) is an electronics company specializing in small electronics items such as radios and set top boxes.

History 
Ferguson is one of the older electronics companies, alongside Ultra, Dynatron, Pye and Bush in the United Kingdom. It was originally an American–Canadian pre-War company making radio sets for the U.K. market based upon contemporary American models. After World War II, it became Ferguson Radio Corporation, making radio receivers and, later, televisions. Later still, it became part of the British Radio Corporation. It was taken over by Thorn Electrical Industries in the late 1950s, but the Ferguson name continued to be used by Thorn, and its successor Thorn EMI.

Throughout the company's early history, Ferguson products were very popular across its wide customer base. By the early 1960s its wide product range included a most comprehensive range of audio and TV equipment. Small, battery-operated portable transistor radios to solid oak 6 ft wide hydraulic lid radiograms sporting fully automatic stackable Garrard turntables, multi-channel radios and 2-foot-wide stereo speakers were commonplace in many UK households. Open reel tape recorders and hi-fis followed.

Sales held well, with 1980s new introductions including personal cassette players, CD players and video recorders.

The 1980s saw much competition from foreign brands such as JVC, Tandy, Hitachi and Sanyo. This took its toll on the Ferguson brand and in 1987 it was sold off to the French electronics company Thomson. Thomson group itself subsequently withdrew from the competitive European consumer electronics market. In the UK, the Ferguson brand was licensed initially to DSI (Dixons and Currys). DSI ceased using it in 2006 and competitor Comet took up the licence and used it until 2012. Comet used the brand on Freeview and Freesat set-top boxes, DVD players and DAB radios. Although Comet went into administration in November 2012, it had discontinued using the Ferguson brand earlier in the year.

Today 
In 2017 Ferguson in the UK was relaunched by Cello Electronics, a British LED TV manufacturer. Cello has licensed the name from Technicolor (Thomson) to be used for a new range of televisions.

UK Trademarks 
There are currently several Ferguson trademarks registered for class 09, audio visual equipment, in the UK:
EU010787471 Registered by Ferguson Sp. z.o.o. 04/04/2012 but opposed and UKUK00000652009 EU003131927  Registered by Thomson Multimedia now Technicolor, dates back to 26/09/1946.

References

External links
 List of Ferguson televisions
 Ferguson UK Website

British brands
Electronics companies of the United Kingdom
Electronics industry in London
Manufacturing companies of the United Kingdom
Radio manufacturers